Michelle Bass (born 2 February 1981) is an English glamour model and television personality turned singer and columnist.

She first came to fame as a contestant on the fifth series of the UK reality television show Big Brother. Previously, Bass had worked as a mortgage adviser, and auditioned for Pop Idol. Born in Newcastle upon Tyne, she attended Gosforth High School.

Career

Big Brother 5

During her time in the Big Brother House, she was a member of a group of contestants who referred to themselves as the "Lip Gloss Bitches", along with Marco Sabba, Emma Greenwood and eventual winner Nadia Almada.

Other media activities

Over Christmas 2004, Bass played The Princess in the pantomime Aladdin at the Alban Arena in St Albans.

Bass has appeared as a contestant on Celebrity Weakest Link, contributed Big Brother columns to OK! magazine and News of the World and played a small role in the film I Want Candy.

In early 2007, Bass moved into the commercial modelling market when she began working with the online clothing store Discoo.

Bass was also The People'''s official Big Brother 8 columnist, and the 2009 News of The World Big Brother columnist.

She appeared in the tenth series of Big Brother, in 2009 as part of the Big Brother UK Tenth Anniversary Celebrations.

In August 2010 Bass returned to the house to compete as a contestant on Ultimate Big Brother''. She was later evicted on Day 16 (the Semi-final).

Personal life

In 2010, Bass married hypnotist Steve McKeown and they have a daughter born in 2013.

References

External links 

1981 births
Living people
Big Brother (British TV series) contestants
English female models
People from Newcastle upon Tyne
People educated at Gosforth Academy